Tuzara is a commune in Călărași District, Moldova. It is composed of three villages: Novaci, Seliștea Nouă and Tuzara.

References

Communes of Călărași District